is a Japanese contemporary artist who works primarily in sculpture and installation, and is also active in painting, performance, video art, fashion, poetry, fiction, and other arts. Her work is based in conceptual art and shows some attributes of feminism, minimalism, surrealism, Art Brut, pop art, and abstract expressionism, and is infused with autobiographical, psychological, and sexual content. She has been acknowledged as one of the most important living artists to come out of Japan, the world's top-selling female artist, and the world's most successful living artist. Her work influenced that of her contemporaries, including Andy Warhol and Claes Oldenburg.

Kusama was raised in Matsumoto, and trained at the Kyoto City University of Arts for a year in a traditional Japanese painting style called nihonga. She was inspired by American Abstract impressionism. She moved to New York City in 1958 and was a part of the New York avant-garde scene throughout the 1960s, especially in the pop-art movement. Embracing the rise of the hippie counterculture of the late 1960s, she came to public attention when she organized a series of happenings in which naked participants were painted with brightly coloured polka dots. She experienced a period in the 70s during which her work was largely forgotten, but a revival of interest in the 1980's brought her art back into public view. Kusama has continued to create art in various museums around the world, from the 1950s through the 2020s.

Kusama has been open about her mental health and has resided since the 1970s in a mental health facility which she leaves daily to walk to her nearby studio to work. She says that art has become her way to express her mental problems. "I fight pain, anxiety, and fear every day, and the only method I have found that relieved my illness is to keep creating art," she told an interviewer in 2012. "I followed the thread of art and somehow discovered a path that would allow me to live."

Biography

Early life: 1929–1949 
Yayoi Kusama was born on 22 March 1929 in Matsumoto, Nagano. Born into a family of merchants who owned a plant nursery and seed farm, Kusama began drawing pictures of pumpkins in elementary school and created artwork she saw from hallucinations, works of which would later define her career. Her mother was not supportive of her creative endeavors; Kusama would rush to finish her art because her mother would take it away to discourage her. Her mother was physically abusive, and Kusama remembers her father as "the type who would play around, who would womanize a lot". The artist says that her mother would often send her to spy on her father's extramarital affairs, which instilled within her a lifelong contempt for sexuality, particularly the male's lower body and the phallus: "I don't like sex. I had an obsession with sex. When I was a child, my father had lovers and I experienced seeing him. My mother sent me to spy on him. I didn't want to have sex with anyone for years [...] The sexual obsession and fear of sex sit side by side in me." Her traumatic childhood, including her fantastic visions, can be said to be the origin of her artistic style.

When Kusama was ten years old, she began to experience vivid hallucinations which she has described as "flashes of light, auras, or dense fields of dots". These hallucinations included flowers that spoke to Kusama, and patterns in fabric that she stared at coming to life, multiplying, and engulfing or expunging her, a process which she has carried into her artistic career and which she calls "self-obliteration". Kusama's art became her escape from her family and her own mind when she began to have hallucinations. She was reportedly fascinated by the smooth white stones covering the bed of the river near her family home, which she cites as another of the seminal influences behind her lasting fixation on dots.

When Kusama was 13, she was sent to work in a military factory where she was tasked with sewing and fabricating parachutes for the Japanese army, then embroiled in World War II. Discussing her time in the factory, she says that she spent her adolescence "in closed darkness" although she could always hear the air-raid alerts going off and see American B-29s flying overhead in broad daylight. Her childhood was greatly influenced by the events of the war, and she claims that it was during this period that she began to value notions of personal and creative freedom. She attended Arigasaki High School.

She went on to study Nihonga painting at the Kyoto Municipal School of Arts and Crafts in 1948. Frustrated with this distinctly Japanese style, she became interested in the European and American avant-garde, staging several solo exhibitions of her paintings in Matsumoto and Tokyo in the 1950s.

Early success in Japan: 1950–1956 
By 1950, she was depicting abstract natural forms in water colour, gouache, and oil paint, primarily on paper. She began covering surfaces—walls, floors, canvases, and later, household objects, and naked assistants—with the polka dots that became a trademark of her work.

The vast fields of polka dots, or "infinity nets", as she called them, were taken directly from her hallucinations. The earliest recorded work in which she incorporated these dots was a drawing in 1939 at age 10, in which the image of a Japanese woman in a kimono, presumed to be the artist's mother, is covered and obliterated by spots. Her first series of large-scale, sometimes more than 30 ft-long canvas paintings, Infinity Nets, were entirely covered in a sequence of nets and dots that alluded to hallucinatory visions.

On her 1954 painting Flower (D.S.P.S), Kusama has said:

New York City: 1957–1972 

After living in Tokyo and France, Kusama left Japan at the age of 27 for the United States. She has stated that she began to consider Japanese society "too small, too servile, too feudalistic, and too scornful of women". Before leaving Japan to the United States, she destroyed many of her early works. In 1957, she moved to Seattle, where she had an exhibition of paintings at the Zoe Dusanne Gallery. She stayed there for a year before moving on to New York City, following correspondence with Georgia O'Keeffe in which she professed an interest in joining the limelight of the city, and sought O'Keeffe's advice. During her time in the US, she quickly established her reputation as a leader in the avant-garde movement and received praise for her work from the anarchist art critic Herbert Read.

In 1961, she moved her studio into the same building as Donald Judd and sculptor Eva Hesse; Hesse became a close friend. In the early 1960s, Kusama began to create so-called soft sculptures by covering items such as ladders, shoes and chairs with white phallic protrusions. Despite the micromanaged intricacy of the drawings, she turned them out fast and in bulk, establishing a rhythm of productivity which she still maintains. She established other habits too, like having herself routinely photographed with new work and regularly appearing in public wearing her signature bob wigs and colorful, avant-garde fashions.

In the early 1960s, Kusama was working with soft sculpture. In June 1963, Kusama, one of her pieces, a couch covered with phallus-like protrusions she had sewn, was exhibited at the Green Gallery. Included in the same exhibition was a papier-mache sculpture by Claes Oldenburg, who had not worked in soft sculpture. Kusama's piece received the most attention from attendees and critics, and by September Oldenburg was exhibiting sewn soft sculpture, some pieces of which were very similar to Kusama's; Oldenburg's wife apologized to Kusama at the exhibit. According to Fordham professor of art Midori Yamamura, Oldenburg likely was inspired by Kusama's work to use sewn pieces himself, pieces which made him an "international star". Kusama became depressed over the incident. A similar incident soon after when Kusama exhibited a boat she had covered in soft-sculpture with photographs of the boat completely covering the walls of the exhibit space, which was very innovative. Andy Warhol remarked on the exhibit, and not long after covered the walls of an exhibit space with photos of a cow, for which he drew significant attention. Kusama became very secretive about her studio work. Helaine Posner, of the Neuberger Museum of Art, said it was likely some combination of racism and sexism that kept Kusama, who was creating work of equal importance to men who were using her ideas and taking the credit for them, from getting the same kinds of backing.

Since 1963, Kusama has continued her series of Mirror/Infinity rooms. In these complex infinity mirror installations, purpose-built rooms lined with mirrored glass contain scores of neon-colored balls, hanging at various heights above the viewer. Standing inside on a small platform, an observer sees light repeatedly reflected off the mirrored surfaces to create the illusion of a never-ending space.

During the following years, Kusama was enormously productive, and by 1966, she was experimenting with room-size, freestanding installations that incorporated mirrors, lights, and piped-in music. She counted Judd and Joseph Cornell among her friends and supporters. However, she did not profit financially from her work. Around this time, Kusama was hospitalized regularly from overwork, and O'Keeffe persuaded her own dealer Edith Herbert to purchase several works to help Kusama stave off financial hardship. She was not able to make the money she believed she deserved, and her frustration became so extreme that she attempted suicide.

In the 1960s, Kusama organized outlandish happenings in conspicuous spots like Central Park and the Brooklyn Bridge, often involving nudity and designed to protest the Vietnam War. In one, she wrote an open letter to Richard Nixon offering to have sex with him if he would stop the Vietnam war. Between 1967 and 1969, she concentrated on performances held with the maximum publicity, usually involving Kusama painting polka dots on her naked performers, as in the Grand Orgy to Awaken the Dead at the MoMA (1969), which took place at the Sculpture Garden of the Museum of Modern Art. During the unannounced event, eight performers under Kusama's direction removed their clothing, stepped nude into a fountain, and assumed poses mimicking the nearby sculptures by Picasso, Giacometti, and Maillol.

In 1968, Kusama presided over the happening Homosexual Wedding at the Church of Self-obliteration at 33 Walker Street in New York and performed alongside Fleetwood Mac and Country Joe and the Fish at the Fillmore East in New York City. She opened naked painting studios and a gay social club called the Kusama 'Omophile Kompany (kok).
The nudity present in Kusama's art and art protests was severely shameful for her family; her high school removed her name from its list of alumni. This made her feel alone, and she attempted suicide again.

In 1966, Kusama first participated in the Venice Biennale for its 33rd edition. Her Narcissus Garden comprised hundreds of mirrored spheres outdoors in what she called a "kinetic carpet". As soon as the piece was installed on a lawn outside the Italian pavilion, Kusama, dressed in a golden kimono, began selling each individual sphere for 1,200 lire (US$2), until the Biennale organizers put an end to her enterprise. Narcissus Garden was as much about the promotion of the artist through the media as it was an opportunity to offer a critique of the mechanization and commodification of the art market.

During her time in New York, Kusama had a brief relationship with artist Donald Judd. She then began a passionate, platonic relationship with the surrealist artist Joseph Cornell. She was 26 years his junior – they called each other daily, sketched each other, and he would send personalized collages to her. Their lengthy association lasted until his death in 1972.

Return to Japan: 1973–1977 

In 1973, Kusama returned to Japan. Her reception from the Japanese art world and press was unsympathetic; one art collector recalled considering her a "scandal queen". She was in ill health, but continued to work, writing shockingly visceral and surrealistic novels, short stories, and poetry.

She became so depressed she was unable to work and made another suicide attempt, then in 1977, found a doctor who was using art therapy to treat mental illness in a hospital setting. She checked herself in and eventually took up permanent residence in the hospital. She has been living at the hospital ever since, by choice. Her studio, where she has continued to produce work since the mid-1970s, is a short distance from the hospital in Tokyo. Kusama is often quoted as saying: "If it were not for art, I would have killed myself a long time ago."

From this base, she has continued to produce artworks in a variety of media, as well as launching a literary career by publishing several novels, a poetry collection, and an autobiography. Her painting style shifted to high-colored acrylics on canvas, on an amped-up scale.

Revival: 1980s–present 
Kusama's move to Japan meant she had to build a new career from scratch.

Her organically abstract paintings of one or two colors (the Infinity Nets series), which she began upon arriving in New York, garnered comparisons to the work of Jackson Pollock, Mark Rothko, and Barnett Newman. When she left New York she was practically forgotten as an artist until the late 1980s and 1990s, when a number of retrospectives revived international interest. Yayoi Kusama: A Retrospective was the first critical survey of Yayoi Kusama presented at the Center for International Contemporary Arts (CICA) in New York in 1989, and was organized by Alexandra Munroe.

Following the success of the Japanese pavilion at the Venice Biennale in 1993, a dazzling mirrored room filled with small pumpkin sculptures in which she resided in color-coordinated magician's attire, Kusama went on to produce a huge, yellow pumpkin sculpture covered with an optical pattern of black spots. The pumpkin came to represent for her a kind of alter-ego or self-portrait. Famous 2.5 meters wide Yellow Pumpkin is made of fiberglass-reinforced plastic and was initially installed in 1994 on the banks of Naoshima, Kagawa, were it was reinstalled in 2022 after being swept into the sea and broken into three pieces by a typhoon a year earlier. Kusama's later installation I'm Here, but Nothing (2000–2008) is a simply furnished room consisting of table and chairs, place settings and bottles, armchairs and rugs, however its walls are tattooed with hundreds of fluorescent polka dots glowing in the UV light. The result is an endless infinite space where the self and everything in the room is obliterated.

The multi-part floating work Guidepost to the New Space, a series of rounded "humps" in fire-engine red with white polka dots, was displayed in Pandanus Lake. Perhaps one of Kusama's most notorious works, various versions of Narcissus Garden have been presented worldwide venues including Le Consortium, Dijon, 2000; Kunstverein Braunschweig, 2003; as part of the Whitney Biennial in Central Park, New York in 2004; and at the Jardin de Tuileries in Paris, 2010.

Kusama continued to work as an artist in her ninth decade. She has harkened back to earlier work by returning to drawing and painting; her work remained innovative and multi-disciplinary, and a 2012 exhibition displayed multiple acrylic-on-canvas works. Also featured was an exploration of infinite space in her Infinity Mirror rooms. These typically involve a cube-shaped room lined in mirrors, with water on the floor and flickering lights; these features suggest a pattern of life and death.

In 2015-2016, the first retrospective exhibition in Scandinavia, curated by Marie Laurberg, travelled to four major museums in the region, opening at Louisiana Museum of Modern Art in Denmark and continuing to Henie Onstad Kunstsenter Museum, Norway; Moderna Museet in Sweden, and Helsinki Art Museum in Finland. This major show contained more than 100 objects and large scale mirror room installations. It presented several early works that had not been shown to the public since they were first created, including a presentation of Kusama's experimental fashion design from the 1960s.

In 2017, a 50-year retrospective of her work opened at the Hirshhorn Museum in Washington, DC. The exhibit featured six Infinity Mirror rooms, and was scheduled to travel to five museums in the US and Canada.

On 25 February 2017, Kusama's All the Eternal Love I Have for the Pumpkins exhibit, one of the six components to her Infinity Mirror rooms at the Hirshhorn Museum, was temporarily closed for three days following damage to one of the exhibit's glowing pumpkin sculptures. The room, which measures  and was filled with over 60 pumpkin sculptures, was one of the museum's most popular attractions ever. Allison Peck, a spokeswoman for the Hirshhorn, said in an interview that the museum "has never had a show with that kind of visitor demand", with the room totalling more than 8,000 visitors between its opening and its temporary closure. While there were conflicting media reports about the cost of the damaged sculpture and how exactly it was broken, Allison Peck stated that "there is no intrinsic value to the individual piece. It is a manufactured component to a larger piece." The exhibit was reconfigured to make up for the missing sculpture, and a new one was to be produced for the exhibit by Kusama. The Infinity Mirrors exhibit became a sensation among art critics as well as on social media. Museum visitors shared 34,000 images of the exhibition to their Instagram accounts, and social media posts using the hashtag #InfiniteKusama garnered 330 million impressions, as reported by the Smithsonian the day after the exhibit's closing. The works provided the perfect setting for Instagram-able selfies which inadvertently added to the performative nature of the works.

Later in 2017, the Yayoi Kusama Museum opened in Tokyo, featuring her works.

On 9 November 2019, Kusama's Everyday I Pray For Love exhibit was shown at David Zwirner Gallery until 14 December 2019. The exhibition incorporated sculptures and paintings, and included the debut of her Infinity Mirrored Room - Dancing Lights That Flew Up To The Universe. The catalogue, published by David Zwirner books, contained texts and poems from the artist.

In January 2020, the Hirshhorn announced it would debut new Kusama acquisitions, including two Infinity Mirror Rooms, at a forthcoming exhibition called One with Eternity: Yayoi Kusama in the Hirshhorn Collection. The name of the exhibit is derived from an open letter Kusama wrote to then-President Richard Nixon in 1968, writing: "let’s forget ourselves, dearest Richard, and become one with the absolute, all together in the altogether."

In November 2021, a monumental exhibition offering an overview of Kusama's main creative periods over the past 70 years, with some 200 works and four Infinity Rooms (unique mirror installations) debuted in the Tel Aviv Museum of Art. The retrospective spans almost 3,000 m2 across the Museum's two buildings, in six galleries and includes 2 new works: A Bouquet of Love I Saw in the Universe, 2021 and Light of the Universe Illuminating the Quest for Truth, 2021.

As of late December 2022, the Hong Kong's M+ museum has a retrospective on Kusama's career entitled "Yayoi Kusama: 1945 to now." The exhibit, showing until May 2023, is the largest retrospective of her art in Asia, not including her home country.

The Pérez Art Museum Miami has the most recent showing of Kusama's work in South Florida. Yayoi Kusama: LOVE IS CALLING will be on view and accessible to the public through 2024.

Meaning and origins of her work 
Curator Mika Yoshitake has stated that Kusama's works on display are meant to immerse the whole person into her accumulations, obsessions, and repetitions. These infinite, repetitive works were originally a way for Kusama to eliminate her intrusive thoughts. Claire Voon has described one of Kusama's mirror exhibits as being able to "transport you to quiet cosmos, to a lonely labyrinth of pulsing light, or to what could be the enveloping innards of a leviathan with the measles".

Creating these feelings amongst audiences was intentional. These experiences seem to be unique to her work because Kusama wanted others to sympathise with her in her troubled life. Bedatri D. Choudhury has described how Kusama feeling not in control throughout her life made her, either consciously or subconsciously, want to control how others perceive time and space when entering her exhibits. This statement seems to imply that without her trauma, Kusama would not have created these works as well or perhaps not at all. Art had become a coping mechanism for Kusama.

Works and publications

Performance

In Yayoi Kusama's Walking Piece (1966), a performance that was documented in a series of eighteen color slides, Kusama walked along the streets of New York City in a traditional Japanese kimono while holding a parasol. The kimono suggested traditional roles for women in Japanese custom. The parasol, however, was made to look inauthentic, as it was actually a black umbrella, painted white on the exterior and decorated with fake flowers. Kusama walked down unoccupied streets in an unknown quest. She then turned and cried without reason, and eventually walked away and vanished from view.

This performance, through the association of the kimono, involved the stereotypes that Asian-American women continued to face. However, as an avant-garde artist living in New York, her situation altered the context of the dress, creating a cross-cultural amalgamation. Kusama was able to highlight the stereotype in which her white American audience categorized her, by showing the absurdity of culturally categorizing people in the world's largest melting pot.

Film 
In 1968, Kusama and Jud Yalkut's collaborative work Kusama's Self-Obliteration won a prize at the Fourth International Experimental Film Competition in Belgium and the Second Maryland Film Festival and the second prize at the Ann Arbor Film Festival. The 1967 experimental film, which Kusama produced and starred in, depicted Kusama painting polka dots on everything around her including bodies.

In 1991, Kusama starred in the film Tokyo Decadence, written and directed by Ryu Murakami, and in 1993, she collaborated with British musician Peter Gabriel on an installation in Yokohama.

Fashion 
In 1968, Kusama established Kusama Fashion Company Ltd, and began selling avantgarde fashion in the "Kusama Corner" at Bloomingdales. In 2009, Kusama designed a handbag-shaped cell phone entitled Handbag for Space Travel, My Doggie Ring-Ring, a pink dotted phone in accompanying dog-shaped holder, and a red and white dotted phone inside a mirrored, dotted box dubbed Dots Obsession, Full Happiness With Dots, for Japanese mobile communication giant KDDI Corporation's "iida" brand. Each phone was limited to 1,000 pieces.

In 2011, Kusama created artwork for six limited-edition lipglosses from Lancôme. That same year, she worked with Marc Jacobs (who visited her studio in Japan in 2006) on a line of Louis Vuitton products, including leather goods, ready-to-wear, accessories, shoes, watches, and jewelry. The products became available in 2012 at a SoHo pop-up shop, which was decorated with Kusama's trademark tentacle-like protrusions and polka-dots. Eventually, six other pop-up shops were opened around the world. When asked about her collaboration with Marc Jacobs, Kusama replied that "his sincere attitude toward art" is the same as her own. Louis Vuitton created a second set of products in 2023.

Writing 
In 1977, Kusama published a book of poems and paintings entitled 7. One year later, her first novel Manhattan Suicide Addict appeared. Between 1983 and 1990, she finished the novels The Hustler's Grotto of Christopher Street (1983), The Burning of St Mark's Church (1985), Between Heaven and Earth (1988), Woodstock Phallus Cutter (1988), Aching Chandelier (1989), Double Suicide at Sakuragazuka (1989), and Angels in Cape Cod (1990), alongside several issues of the magazine S&M Sniper in collaboration with photographer Nobuyoshi Araki. Her most recent writing endeavor includes her autobiography Infinity Net published in 2003 that depicts her life from growing up in Japan, her departure to the United States, and her return to her home country, where she now resides. Infinity Net includes the artist's poetry and photographs of her exhibitions.

Commissions 

To date, Kusama has completed several major outdoor sculptural commissions, mostly in the form of brightly hued monstrous plants and flowers, for public and private institutions including Pumpkin (1994) for the Fukuoka Municipal Museum of Art; The Visionary Flowers (2002) for the Matsumoto City Museum of Art; Tsumari in Bloom (2003) for Matsudai Station, Niigata; Tulipes de Shangri-La (2003) for Euralille in Lille, France; Pumpkin (2006) at Bunka-mura on Benesse Island of Naoshima; Hello, Anyang with Love (2007) for Pyeonghwa Park (now referred as World Cup Park), Anyang; and The Hymn of Life: Tulips (2007) for the Beverly Gardens Park in Los Angeles. In 1998, she realized a mural for the hallway of the Gare do Oriente subway station in Lisbon. Alongside these monumental works, she has produced smaller scale outdoor pieces including Key-Chan and Ryu-Chan, a pair of dotted dogs. All the outdoor works are cast in highly durable fiberglass-reinforced plastic, then painted in urethane to glossy perfection.

In 2010, Kusama designed a Town Sneaker styled bus, which she titled Mizutama Ranbu (Wild Polka Dot Dance) and whose route travels through her hometown of Matsumoto. In 2011, she was commissioned to design the front cover of millions of pocket London Underground maps; the result is entitled Polka Dots Festival in London (2011). Coinciding with an exhibition of the artist's work at the Whitney Museum of American Art in 2012, a  reproduction of Kusama's painting Yellow Trees (1994) covered a condominium building under construction in New York's Meatpacking District. That same year, Kusama conceived her floor installation Thousands of Eyes as a commission for the new Queen Elizabeth II Courts of Law, Brisbane.

Select exhibitions 
 Rodenbeck, J.F. "Yayoi Kusama: Surface, Stitch, Skin." Zegher, M. Catherine de. Inside the Visible: An Elliptical Traverse of 20th Century Art in, of, and from the Feminine. Cambridge, Mass: The MIT Press, 1996.  
 Institute of Contemporary Art, Boston, 30 January – 12 May 1996.
 Kusama, Yayoi, and Damien Hirst. Yayoi Kusama Now. New York, N.Y.: Robert Miller Gallery, 1998.  
 Robert Miller Gallery, New York, 11 June – 7 August 1998.
 Kusama, Yayoi, and Lynn Zelevansky. Love Forever: Yayoi Kusama, 1958–1968. Los Angeles: Los Angeles County Museum of Art, 1998.  
 Los Angeles County Museum of Art, 8 March – 8 June 1998; three other locations through 4 July 1999.
 Kusama, Yayoi. Yayoi Kusama. Wien: Kunsthalle Wien, 2002.  
 Kusama, Yayoi. Yayoi Kusama. Paris: Les Presses du Reel, 2002.  
 Seven European exhibitions in France, Germany, Denmark, etc.; 2001–2003.
 Kusama, Yayoi. Kusamatorikkusu = Kusamatrix. Tōkyō: Kadokawa Shoten, 2004.  
 Mori Art Museum, 7 February – 9 May 2004; Mori Geijutsu Bijutsukan, Sapporo, 5 June – 22 August 2004.
 Kusama, Yayoi, and Tōru Matsumoto. Kusama Yayoi eien no genzai = Yayoi Kusama: eternity-modernity. Tōkyō: Bijutsu Shuppansha, 2005.  
 Tōkyō Kokuritsu Kindai Bijutsukan, 26 October – 19 December 2004; Kyōto Kokuritsu Kindai Bijutsukan, 6 January – 13 February 2005; Hiroshima-shi Gendai Bijutsukan, 22 February – 17 April 2005; Kumamoto-shi Gendai Bijutsukan, 29 April – 3 July 2005; at Matsumoto-shi Bijutsukan, 30 July – 10 October 2005.
 Applin, Jo, and Yayoi Kusama. Yayoi Kusama. London: Victoria Miro Gallery, 2007.  
 Victoria Miro Gallery, London, 10 October – 17 November 2007.
 Kusama, Yayoi. Yayoi Kusama. New York: Gagosian Gallery, 2009.  
 Gagosian Gallery, New York, 16 April – 27 June 2009; Gagosian Gallery, Beverly Hills, 30 May – 17 July 2009.
 Morris, Frances, and Jo Applin. Yayoi Kusama. London: Tate Publishing, 2012.  
 Reina Sofia, Madrid, 10 May – 12 September 2011; Centre Pompidou, Paris, 10 October 2011 – 9 January 2012; Whitney Museum of American Art, New York, 12 July – 30 September 2012; Tate Modern (London), 9 February – 5 June 2012.
 Kusama, Yayoi, and Akira Tatehata. Yayoi Kusama: I Who Have Arrived in Heaven. New York: David Zwirner, 2014.  
 David Zwirner Gallery, New York, 8 November – 21 December 2013.
 Laurberg, Marie: Yayoi Kusama – In Infinity, Denmark: Louisiana Museum of Modern Art, 2015, Heine Onstadt, Oslo, 2016, Moderna Museum, Stockholm, 2016, and Helsinki Art Museum, 2016
 David Zwirner Gallery, New York, 9 November – 14 December 2019.
 Pérez Art Museum Miami. Yayoi Kusama: LOVE IS CALLING, 9 March 2023 – 11 February 2024.

Illustration work 
 Carroll, Lewis and Yayoi Kusama. Lewis Carroll's Alice's Adventures in Wonderland. London: Penguin Classics, 2012.

Chapters 
 Nakajima, Izumi. "Yayoi Kusama between abstraction and pathology." Pollock, Griselda, ed. Psychoanalysis and the Image: Transdisciplinary Perspectives. Malden, MA: Blackwell Pub, 2006. pp. 127–160.  
 Klaus Podoll, "Die Künstlerin Yayoi Kusama als pathographischer Fall." Schulz R, Bonanni G, Bormuth M, eds. Wahrheit ist, was uns verbindet: Karl Jaspers' Kunst zu philosophieren. Göttingen, Wallstein, 2009. p. 119.  
 Cutler, Jody B. "Narcissus, Narcosis, Neurosis: The Visions of Yayoi Kusama." Wallace, Isabelle Loring, and Jennie Hirsh. Contemporary Art and Classical Myth. Farnham, Surrey: Ashgate, 2011. pp. 87–109.

Autobiography, writing 
 Kusama, Yayoi. A Book of Poems and Paintings. Tokyo: Japan Edition Art, 1977.
 Kusama, Yayoi. Kusama Yayoi: Driving Image = Yayoi Kusama. Tōkyō: PARCO shuppan, 1986.  
 Kusama, Yayoi, Ralph F. McCarthy, Hisako Ifshin, and Yayoi Kusama. Violet Obsession: Poems. Berkeley: Wandering Mind Books, 1998.  
 Kusama, Yayoi, Ralph F. McCarthy, Yayoi Kusama, and Yayoi Kusama. Hustlers Grotto: Three Novellas. Berkeley, Calif: Wandering Mind Books, 1998.  
 Kusama, Yayoi. Infinity Net: The Autobiography of Yayoi Kusama. Chicago: The University of Chicago Press, 2011.  
 Kusama, Yayoï, and Isabelle Charrier. Manhattan Suicide Addict. Dijon: Presses du Réel, 2005.

Catalogue raisonné, etc. 
 Kusama, Yayoi. Yayoi Kusama: Print Works. Tokyo: Abe Corp, 1992.  
 Hoptman, Laura, Akira Tatehata, and Udo Kultermann. Yayoi Kusama. London: Phaidon Press, 2003.  
 Kusama, Yayoi, and Hideki Yasuda. Yayoi Kusama Furniture by Graf: Decorative Mode No. 3. Tōkyō: Seigensha Art Publishing, 2003.  
 Kusama, Yayoi. Kusama Yayoi zen hangashū, 1979–2004 = All Prints of Kusama Yayoi, 1979–2004. Tōkyō: Abe Shuppan, 2006.  
 Kusama, Yayoi, Laura Hoptman, Akira Tatehata, Udo Kultermann, Catherine Taft. Yayoi Kusama. London: Phaidon Press, 2017.  
 Yoshitake, Mika, Chiu, Melissa, Dumbadze, Alexander Blair, Jones, Alex, Sutton, Gloria, Tezuka, Miwako. Yayoi Kusama : Infinity Mirrors. Washington, DC. . OCLC 954134388

Exhibitions 

In 1959, Kusama had her first solo exhibition in New York at the Brata Gallery, an artist's co-op. She showed a series of white net paintings which were enthusiastically reviewed by Donald Judd (both Judd and Frank Stella then acquired paintings from the show). Kusama has since exhibited work with Claes Oldenburg, Andy Warhol, and Jasper Johns, among others. Exhibiting alongside European artists including Lucio Fontana, Pol Bury, Otto Piene, and Gunther Uecker, in 1962, she was the only female artist to take part in the widely acclaimed Nul (Zero) international group exhibition at the Stedelijk Museum in Amsterdam.

Exhibition list 

 1976: Kitakyushu Municipal Museum of Art
1983: Yayoi Kusama's Self-Obliteration (Performance) at Video Gallery SCAN, Tokyo, Japan
 1993: Represented Japan at the Venice Biennale
 1998: "Love Forever: Yayoi Kusama,1958–1969", LACMA
 1998–99: "Love Forever: Yayoi Kusama,1958–1969" – exhibit traveled to Museum of Modern Art, New York, Walker Art Center, Minneapolis and Museum of Contemporary Art, Tokyo)
 2001–2003: Le Consortium – exhibit traveled to Maison de la Culture du Japon, Paris; Kunsthallen Brandts, Odense, Denmark; Les Abattoirs, Toulouse; Kunsthalle Wien, Vienna; and Artsonje Center, Seoul
 2004: KUSAMATRIX, Mori Art Museum, Tokyo
 2004–2005: KUSAMATRIX traveled to Art Park Museum of Contemporary Art, Sapporo Art Park, Hokkaido); Eternity – Modernity, National Museum of Modern Art, Tokyo (touring Japan)
 2007: FINA Festival 2007. Kusama created Guidepost to the New Space, a vibrant outdoor installation for Birrarung Marr beside the Yarra River in Melbourne. In 2009, the Guideposts were re-installed at Fairchild Tropical Botanic Garden, this time displayed as floating "humps" on a lake.
 2009: The Mirrored Years traveled to Museum of Contemporary Art, Sydney, and City Gallery, Wellington, New Zealand
 2010: Museum Boijmans Van Beuningen purchased the work Infinity Mirror Room – Phalli's Field. As of 13 September of that year the mirror room is permanently exhibited in the entrance area of the museum.
 July 2011: Museo Reina Sofía, Madrid, Spain
 2012: Tate Modern, London. Described as "akin to being suspended in a beautiful cosmos gazing at infinite worlds, or like a tiny dot of fluoresecent plankton in an ocean of glowing microscopic life", the exhibition features a retrospective spanning Kusama's entire career.
 30 June 2013 – 16 September 2013: MALBA, the Latinamerican Art Museum of Buenos Aires, Buenos Aires, Argentina
 22 May 2014 – 27 June 2014: Instituto Tomie Ohtake, São Paulo, Brazil
 17 September 2015 – 24 January 2016: In Infinity, Louisiana Museum of Modern Art, Humlebæk, Denmark
 12 June – 9 August 2015: Yayoi Kusama: Infinity Theory, The Garage Museum of Contemporary Art, Moscow, Russia. This was the artist's first solo exhibition in Russia.
 19 February – 15 May 2016: Yayoi Kusama – I uendeligheten, Henie Onstad Kunstsenter, Oslo, Norway
 20 September 2015 – September 2016: Yayoi Kusama: Infinity Mirrored Room, The Broad, Los Angeles, California
  12 June – 18 September 2016: Kusama: At the End of the Universe, Museum of Fine Arts, Houston, Houston, Texas
 1 May 2016 – 30 November 2016: Yayoi Kusama: Narcissus Garden, The Glass House, New Canaan, Connecticut.
 25 May 2016 – 30 July 2016: Yayoi Kusama: sculptures, paintings & mirror rooms, Victoria Miro Gallery, London, United Kingdom.
 7 October 2016 – 22 January 2017: Yayoi Kusama: In Infinity, organised by the Louisiana Museum of Modern Art in cooperation with Henie Onstad Kunstsenter, Moderna Museet/ArkDes and Helsinki Art Museum HAM in Helsinki, Finland.
 5 November 2016 – 17 April 2017: "Dot Obsessions – Tasmania", MONA: Museum of Old and New Art, Hobart, Australia.
 23 February 2017 – 14 May 2017: Yayoi Kusama: Infinity Mirrors, a traveling museum show originating at the Hirshhorn Museum and Sculpture Garden, Washington, DC
 30 June 2017 – 10 September 2017: Yayoi Kusama: Infinity Mirrors, exhibition travels to Seattle Art Museum, Seattle, Washington
 9 June 2017 – 3 September 2017: Yayoi Kusama: Life is the Heart of a Rainbow, National Gallery Singapore.
 October 2017 – January 2018: Yayoi Kusama: Infinity Mirrors, exhibition travels to The Broad, Los Angeles, California
 October 2017 – February 2018: Yayoi Kusama: All the Eternal Love I Have for the Pumpkins, Dallas Museum of Art, Dallas, Texas
 November 2017 – February 2018: Yayoi Kusama: Life is the Heart of a Rainbow and Obliteration Room, GOMA, Brisbane, Australia
 December 2017 – April 2018: Flower Obsession, Triennial, NGV, Melbourne, Australia
 March 2018 – February 2019"Pumpkin Forever'(Forever Museum of ContemporaryArt), Gion-Kyoto, Japan
 March–May 2018: Yayoi Kusama: Infinity Mirrors, exhibition travels to Art Gallery of Ontario, Toronto, Ontario, Canada
 May–September 2018: Yayoi Kusama: Life is the Heart of a Rainbow, Museum of Modern and Contemporary Art in Nusantara (Museum MACAN), Jakarta, Indonesia
 July–September 2018: Yayoi Kusama: Infinity Mirrors, exhibition travels to Cleveland Museum of Art, exhibition travels to Cleveland, Ohio
 July–November 2018: Yayoi Kusama: Where The Lights In My Heart Go, exhibition travels to deCordova Museum and Sculpture Park, Lincoln, MA
26 July 2018 - Spring 2019: Yayoi Kusama: With All My Love for the Tulips, I Pray Forever  (2011)
 March–September 2019: Yayoi Kusama, Museum Voorlinden, Wassenaar, The Netherlands
 9 November 2019 – 14 December 2019: Yayoi Kusama: Everyday I Pray For Love, David Zwirner Gallery, New York, NY
 4 January – 18 March 2020: Brilliance of the Souls, Maraya, AlUla
 4 April – 19 September 2020: Yayoi Kusama: "One with Eternity: Yayoi Kusama in the Hirshhorn Collection," Washington, DC
 31 July 2020 – 3 January 2021: STARS: Six Contemporary Artists from Japan to the World, Tokyo, Japan
 10 April – 31 October 2021: Kusama: Cosmic Nature, New York Botanical Garden, New York, NY
 15 November 2021 - 23 April 2022: "Yayoi Kusama : A Retrospective", Tel Aviv Museum of Art, Israel 
 9 March 2023 – 11 February, 2024: Yayoi Kusama: LOVE IS CALLING, Pérez Art Museum Miami, Florida

Permanent Infinity Room installations 
 Infinity Dots Mirrored Room (1996), Mattress Factory, Pittsburgh, Pennsylvania
 Infinity Mirror Room fireflies on Water (2000), Musée des Beaux-Arts de Nancy, Nancy (France)
 You Who Are Getting Obliterated in the Dancing Swarm of Fireflies (2005), Phoenix Art Museum, Phoenix, Arizona
 Gleaming Lights of the Souls (2008), Louisiana Museum of Modern Art, Humlebæk, Denmark
 The Souls of Millions of Light Years Away (2013), The Broad, Los Angeles, California
 The Spirits of the Pumpkins Descended into the Heavens (2015), National Gallery of Australia, Canberra
 Phalli's Field (1965/2016), Museum Boijmans Van Beuningen, Rotterdam, Netherlands
 Love is Calling (2013/2019), Institute of Contemporary Art, Boston, Boston, Massachusetts
 Light of Life  (2018), North Carolina Museum of Art, Raleigh, North Carolina
 Brilliance of the Souls (2019), Museum of Modern and Contemporary Art in Nusantara (Museum MACAN), Jakarta, Indonesia
 Infinity Mirror Room – Let's Survive Forever (2019), Art Gallery of Ontario, Toronto, Ontario

Peer review 
 Applin, Jo. Yayoi Kusama: Infinity Mirror Room – Phallis Field. Afterall, 2012.
 Hoptman, Laura J., et al. Yayoi Kusama. Phaidon Press Limited, 2000.
 Lenz, Heather, director. Infinity. Magnolia Pictures, 2018.

Collections 
Kusama's work is in the collections of museums throughout the world, including the Museum of Modern Art, New York; Los Angeles County Museum of Art, Los Angeles; Walker Art Center, Minneapolis; Phoenix Art Museum, Phoenix; Tate Modern, London; Stedelijk Museum, Amsterdam; Centre Pompidou, Paris; Art Gallery of Ontario, Toronto; Utah Museum of Fine Arts, Salt Lake City, UT; and the National Museum of Modern Art, Tokyo and in the City Museum of Art in her home town of Matsumoto entitled The Place for My Soul.

Recognition 

Yayoi Kusama's image is included in the iconic 1972 poster Some Living American Women Artists by Mary Beth Edelson.

In 2017, a fifty-year retrospective of Kusama's work opened at the Hirshhorn Museum in Washington, DC. That same year, the Yayoi Kusama Museum was inaugurated in Tokyo. Other major retrospectives of her work have been held at the Museum of Modern Art (1998), the Whitney Museum (2012), and the Tate Modern (2012). In 2015, the website Artsy named Kusama one of its top 10 living artists of the year.

Kusama has received many awards, including the Asahi Prize (2001); Ordre des Arts et des Lettres (2003); the National Lifetime Achievement Award from the Order of the Rising Sun (2006); and a Lifetime Achievement Award from the Women's Caucus for Art. In October 2006, Kusama became the first Japanese woman to receive the Praemium Imperiale, one of Japan's highest honors for internationally recognized artists. She received the Person of Cultural Merit (2009) and Ango awards (2014). In 2014, Kusama was ranked the most popular artist of the year after a record-breaking number of visitors flooded her Latin American tour, Yayoi Kusama: Infinite Obsession. Venues from Buenos Aires to Mexico City received more than 8,500 visitors each day.

Kusama gained media attention for partnering with the Hirshhorn Museum and Sculpture Garden to make her 2017 Infinity Mirror rooms accessible to visitors with disabilities or mobility issues; in a new initiative among art museums, the venue mapped out the six individual rooms and provided disabled individuals visiting the exhibition access to a complete 360-degree virtual reality headset that allowed them to experience every aspect of the rooms, as if they were actually walking through them.

According to Hanna Schouwink of David Zwirner Gallery speaking in 2018, Kusama is "officially the world's most successful living artist".

Art market 
Kusama's work has performed strongly at auction: top prices for her work are for paintings from the late 1950s and early 1960s. As of 2012, her work has the highest turnover of any living woman artist. In November 2008, Christie's New York sold a 1959 white Infinity Net painting formerly owned by Donald Judd, No. 2, for US$5.1 million, then a record for a living female artist. In comparison, the highest price for a sculpture from her New York years is £72,500 (US$147,687), fetched by the 1965 wool, pasta, paint and hanger assemblage Golden Macaroni Jacket at Sotheby's London in October 2007. A 2006 acrylic on fiberglass-reinforced plastic pumpkin earned $264,000, the top price for one of her sculptures, also at Sotheby's in 2007. Her Flame of Life – Dedicated to Tu-Fu (Du-Fu) sold for US$960,000 at Art Basel/Hong Kong in May 2013, the highest price paid at the show. Kusama became the most expensive living female artist at auction when White No. 28 (1960) from her signature Infinity Nets series sold for $7.1 million at a 2014 Christie's auction.

In popular culture 
 Superchunk, an American indie band, included a song called "Art Class (Song for Yayoi Kusama)" on its Here's to Shutting Up album.
 In 1967, Jud Yalkut made a film of Kusama titled Kusama’s Self-Obliteration.
 In 2013, the British indie pop duo The Boy Least Likely To made song tribute to Yayoi Kusama, writing a song specially about her. They wrote on their blog that they admire Kusama's work because she puts her fears into it, something that they themselves often do.
 Magnolia Pictures released the biographical documentary by Heather Lenz, Kusama: Infinity, in 2018 and a DVD version in 2019.
 Veuve Clicquot and Kusama created a limited-edition bottle and sculpture in September 2020.

References

External links 

 Official Site
 YAYOI KUSAMA MUSEUM (English)
 Love Forever: Yayoi Kusama, 1958–1968, Museum of Modern Art
 How to Paint Like Yayoi Kusama
 Yayoi Kusama in the collection of The Museum of Modern Art
 [*Women Artists and Postwar Abstraction | HOW TO SEE the art movement with Corey D'Augustine, MoMA
 Phoenix Art Museum online 
 Earth is a polka dot. An interview with Yayoi Kusama Video by Louisiana Channel
 BBC NewsNight Yayoi Kusama
 Why Yayoi Kusama matters now more than ever
 Yayoi Kusama art for the Instagram age
 Yayoi Kusama/artnet

1929 births
Living people
20th-century Japanese women artists
20th-century Japanese artists
21st-century Japanese women artists
21st-century Japanese artists
Feminist artists
Japanese installation artists
Japanese contemporary artists
20th-century Japanese sculptors
Kyoto City University of Arts alumni
Modern artists
Japanese pop artists
Recipients of the Order of Culture
Recipients of the Order of the Rising Sun, 4th class
Recipients of the Praemium Imperiale
Japanese people with disabilities
21st-century sculptors
Japanese women sculptors
People from Matsumoto, Nagano
Asexual people